Epichloë danica is a hybrid asexual species in the fungal genus Epichloë. 

A systemic and seed-transmissible grass symbiont first described in 2013,  Epichloë danica is a natural allopolyploid of Epichloë bromicola and Epichloë sylvatica.

Epichloë danica is found in Europe, where it has been identified in the grass species Hordelymus europaeus.

References

danica
Fungi described in 2013
Fungi of Europe